Abasse Ba  (born 12 July 1976) is a Senegalese former professional footballer who played as a defender. Apart from a loan stint at Al Rayyan, he spent all of his professional in France, with Louhans-Cuiseaux FC, Dijon FCO, and Le Havre AC.

Career 
Born in Pelelkindessa, Senegal, Ba began his career in France with Louhans-Cuiseaux. After three years with the club he moved to Dijon FC. At Dijon he played 152 games scoring four goals. After six years there he left and signed with Le Havre AC.

On 27 April 2009, Ba joined Al Rayyan on loan.

References

External links

1976 births
Living people
Senegalese footballers
Association football defenders
Ligue 1 players
Louhans-Cuiseaux FC players
Dijon FCO players
Le Havre AC players
Al-Rayyan SC players
Senegalese expatriate footballers
Senegalese expatriate sportspeople in France
Expatriate footballers in France
Senegalese expatriate sportspeople in Qatar
Expatriate footballers in Qatar